Virginia "Ginny" Stikeman is a Canadian filmmaker, director, producer and editor known for her documentary work. Stikeman had a 30-year career at the National Film Board of Canada, and led its women's unit, Studio D, from 1990 until its closure in 1996.

Biography  
Ginny Stikeman was born in Ottawa, Ontario, and grew up in Montreal, Quebec. She graduated from McGill University with a BA in English and French. After a time working in Paris and then in Montreal for Time magazine, she joined the National Film Board of Canada in 1968 as a researcher for Challenge for Change. She later trained as an editor and moved to Studio D, the women's unit, in 1975 as an editor and producer.

Career 
Among her more noteworthy achievements at Studio D, Stikeman was the co-producer on the award-winning documentary Forbidden Love: The Unashamed Stories of Lesbian Lives. She co-directed Sisters in the Struggle with Dionne Brand. She was also the producer and editor of Older, Stronger, and Wiser.

Stikeman was announced as acting executive producer for Studio D in 1986 and was officially appointed the position of executive producer in 1990. Stikeman worked as executive producer until Studio D's closure in 1996, officially retiring in 1998.

After retirement, Stikeman has worked with the Blue Metropolis literary festival as part of the Premio Azul Programming Committee in Montreal, Quebec, a non-profit organization that promotes and encourages reading, writing and creativity for people of all cultures. The organization was founded in 1997 by Linda Leith. The Blue Metropolis Festival produces the annual International Literary Festival with a variety of awards and prizes. Stikeman started sponsoring the Metropolis Azul Prize in 2013, which is awarded each year to an author from any country who creates a work of fiction that treats aspects of Hispanic culture and is published in Spanish, English or French.

Awards and nominations 
Stikeman was the editor on I'll Find a Way, which won the Academy Award for best live action short film, and Cree Hunters of Mistassini, which won the BAFTA for best documentary.

Legacy 
Stikeman is credited with bringing a deep commitment to film activism and "getting more women of different ethnic backgrounds into filmmaking".

Filmography 

Filmography from IMDb

References

External links 
 

1941 births
Living people
Canadian documentary film directors
Canadian women film directors
Film directors from Montreal
Film directors from Ottawa
LGBT film directors
20th-century Canadian LGBT people
National Film Board of Canada people
Canadian women documentary filmmakers
McGill University alumni